María Paula Fernández Estigarribia (born 30 August 1998) is a Paraguayan handball player for Club Cerro Porteño and the Paraguay national team.

She was selected to represent Paraguay at the 2017 World Women's Handball Championship.

Individual Awards and recognitions
2016 Pan American Women's Youth Handball Championship: All-star team left wing
2022 South and Central American Women's Club Handball Championship: All-star team left wing

References

1998 births
Living people
Paraguayan female handball players
20th-century Paraguayan women
21st-century Paraguayan women